Siobla is a genus of insects belonging to the family Tenthredinidae.

Species:
 Siobla ruficornis
 Siobla sturmii

References

Tenthredinidae
Sawfly genera